Mitchell Frederick Hepburn (August 12, 1896 – January 5, 1953) was the 11th premier of Ontario, from 1934 to 1942. He was the youngest premier in Ontario history, becoming premier at age 37. He was the only Ontario Liberal Party leader in the 20th century to lead his party to two majorities.

Early life

Born in St. Thomas, Ontario, Hepburn attended school in Elgin County and hoped to become a lawyer. His formal education ended abruptly, however, when someone threw an apple at a visiting dignitary, Sir Adam Beck, and knocked his silk top hat off his head. Hepburn was accused of the deed and denied it but refused to identify the culprit. Refusing to apologize, he walked out of his high school and obtained a job as a bank clerk at the Canadian Bank of Commerce where he worked from 1913 to 1917. He eventually became an accountant at the bank's Winnipeg branch.

At the outbreak of World War I, Hepburn had already enlisted in the 34th Fort Garry Horse but was unable to obtain his parents' consent to sign up for the Canadian Expeditionary Force. He then became a lieutenant in the 25th Elgin Regiment of the Canadian Militia, and was conscripted to the 1st (Western Ontario) Battalion in 1918. He transferred to the Royal Air Force and was sent to Deseronto for training but suffered injuries in an automobile accident that summer, followed by being bedridden by the influenza in the fall, both of which kept him from active service. He returned to St. Thomas to run his family's onion farm.

Early political career

After the war, Hepburn joined the United Farmers of Ontario (UFO) helping to start its branch in Elgin County, but by the mid-1920s he switched to the Liberal Party. In the 1926 election, he was elected to the House of Commons of Canada as a representative of Elgin West, and was overwhelmingly re-elected in the 1930 election.

Later that year he became leader of the Liberal Party of Ontario. His support of farmers and free trade, and his former membership in the UFO allowed him to attract Harry Nixon's rump of UFO Members of the Legislative Assembly (MLAs) into the Liberal Party (as Liberal-Progressives). This and the Great Depression led to the defeat of the unpopular Conservative premier George Stewart Henry in the 1934 provincial election. His stance against the prohibition of alcohol allowed him to break the Liberal Party from the militant prohibitionist stance that had helped reduce it to a rural, Protestant south western Ontario rump in the 1920s.

Hepburn represented a type of agrarian democracy that detested Toryism and valued oratory. He once saw a pile of manure situated in a village square, and proceeded to jump on top of it to give a speech, apologizing to the crowd for speaking from a Tory platform. He also used the same line when standing on a manure spreader, only to have a heckler shout, "Well, wind 'er up Mitch, because she's never carried a bigger load!"

On his death, the Toronto Star observed:

Premier of Ontario

Hepburn's premiership achieved international attention, which merited his appearance on Time magazine's cover in 1937.

As premier, Hepburn undertook a number of measures that enhanced his reputation as the practitioner of a highly vigorous style. In a public show of austerity, he closed Chorley Park, the residence of the Lieutenant Governor of Ontario, auctioned off the chauffeur driven limousines that had been used by the previous Conservative cabinet, and fired many civil servants. To improve the province's welfare, he gave money to mining industries in Northern Ontario and introduced compulsory milk pasteurization (in so doing, he has been credited with virtually wiping out bovine tuberculosis in the province). Breaking with the temperance stance of previous Liberal governments, Hepburn expanded the availability of liquour by allowing hotels to sell beer and wine.

Industrial labour reform
The Industrial Standards Act, which emulated the US National Industrial Recovery Act, was introduced in 1935 to set minimum wages and working conditions by industry and geographic area. It was described by Labour Minister David Croll as "the most controversial piece of legislation now on the Statute Books of the Province," and it came about after federal efforts that had been instituted under RB Bennett's "New Deal" were declared unconstitutional.

Guardianship of Dionne quintuplets
The government also made international news by making the Dionne quintuplets wards of the provincial Crown in response to public outrage of plans by promoters to exploit the infants by putting them on display at the Chicago World's Fair. The Legislative Assembly passed legislation in that regard and subsequently replaced it in 1944; it was not repealed until 2006.

Tax collection

As Treasurer of Ontario, Hepburn adopted a more aggressive approach in the collection of succession duty on large estates, which resulted in millions of dollars in extra government revenues. He made no apologies for doing so, as he noted in a speech in 1938:

One estate that was of particular focus in this campaign was that of the late John Rudolphus Booth, who had died in 1925. Although succession duties of $4.28 million ($ in current terms) were paid in 1927, Hepburn subsequently claimed more in 1937 and had the Legislative Assembly of Ontario pass the necessary legislation to overcome the legal obstacles. Booth's heirs eventually paid another $3 million ($ in current terms) in 1939.

Cancellation of Hydro contracts
As part of his drive to cut government spending, the Power Commission Act, 1935, was passed to cancel contracts that the Hydro-Electric Power Commission of Ontario had signed between 1926 and 1930 for delivery of electricity from power plants in Quebec by declaring them to be "void and unenforceable." The move temporarily shut Ontario out of world bond markets. The Act was declared to be ultra vires by the Ontario Court of Appeal in 1937 as being legislation in derogation of extraprovincial rights (although later jurisprudence has suggested that the Court may have overreached in its rulings). Many such contracts were later renegotiated at lower volumes and prices.

Taking back forests

Hepburn took an aggressive position with respect to timber licences in Northern Ontario that were being held by companies that would (or could) not cut wood on them. In that regard, in 1936 the Forest Resources Regulation Act was passed to grant the government broad powers for mandating minimum production quotas, maximum limits in line with good forestry practice, reduce licensed acreages that were in excess of requirements, and increase stumpage fees on companies "operating or carrying on business in a manner detrimental to the public interest."

In 1937, the Settlers' Pulpwood Protection Act was passed to govern the supply of pulpwood from private lands, together with fixing quotas and prices to be followed.

The Crown Timber Act'''s provisions, which had been in effect since the time of Arthur Sturgis Hardy and required logs to be manufactured as timber before they could exported from the province, were relaxed by order in council in 1936 to create employment opportunities in the logging industry.

When the Abitibi Power and Paper Company, in receivership since 1932, was ordered into liquidation in 1940, Hepburn appointed a Royal Commission to investigate the matter to determine the best course of resolution. The Legislative Assembly imposed a moratorium on liquidation proceedings in 1941, which was ultimately upheld by the Judicial Committee of the Privy Council in 1943. The Commission's recommended plan was accepted by all creditors. It would emerge from receivership in 1946, after one of the longest such receiverships in Canadian history.

Fight with CIO
In later years, Hepburn would form a Liberal–Labour alliance with the Communist Party of Canada, but as premier, he opposed unions and refused to let the CIO form unions in Ontario. On April 8, 1937, the CIO-backed General Motors plant in Oshawa went on strike and demanded an eight-hour workday, a seniority system, and the recognition of its CIO-affiliated United Auto Workers union. The strikers were also supported by the Co-operative Commonwealth Federation, which was Canada's main left-wing party. Hepburn, then professing a deep concern about radicals among auto workers, was supported by the owners of the plant and General Motors when he organized a volunteer police force to help him put down the strike after Canadian Prime Minister William Lyon Mackenzie King had refused to send the Royal Canadian Mounted Police. The force was somewhat derisively known as "Hepburn's Hussars" or the "Sons of Mitches." Cabinet ministers who disagreed with Hepburn over the issue were forced to resign. However, the strike held out, and Hepburn capitulated on April 23, 1937.

Conflict with Mackenzie King

Hepburn remained a bitter opponent of Mackenzie King after the strike and harshly criticized King's war effort in 1940, after the outbreak of World War II had caused a resolution in the legislature to be passed 44-10 to accuse the federal government of mishandling the war effort. The Conservative opposition voted unanimously for the resolution, but the motion split the governing Liberals, with nine members of Hepburn's caucus voting against and others leaving the chamber before the vote. Hepburn, thinking that Canada should be doing more to support the war, helped to organize the military districts in Ontario and encouraged men to volunteer when Mackenzie King chose not to introduce conscription.

Hepburn supported King's opponent, Arthur Meighen, in a by-election in Toronto in 1942, despite Hepburn's later alliance with the Communist Party of Canada. Meighen's unusual source of support did not bring him to success, and he lost the by-election since the Liberals did not run a candidate, and King ordered party resources to be sent to the CCF candidate. However, King was politically much stronger than Hepburn; federal Liberal supporters, as well as those who thought an erratically-driven rift between the provincial and federal parties to be suicidal, called for him to step down. Hepburn ultimately resigned as premier in October 1942 but continued to serve as Treasurer of Ontario and party leader until the following year.

Aftermath
Although Gordon Daniel Conant had become premier, many people continued to think that was in name only. Senior cabinet ministers such as Provincial Secretary Harry Nixon resigned and demanded a leadership convention. Pressure from both provincial and federal Liberals caused one to be held in May 1943. Hepburn finally tendered his resignation as leader (by telegram), and Nixon was elected the new party leader and was appointed as premier.

The Liberals under Nixon were soon routed in the 1943 Ontario election and fell to third-party status, behind the Progressive Conservatives, led by George Drew, and the Co-operative Commonwealth Federation, led by Ted Jolliffe. Hepburn himself was re-elected in his riding as an Independent Liberal while he was calling for a Liberal-Conservative coalition against the burgeoning CCF. The Liberal caucus unanimously asked Hepburn to resume the party's leadership in 1944.

Now branding Drew's Conservatives as the greatest menace to Canada, he reversed his earlier criticism of Mackenzie King's war effort and campaigned for Liberal candidate General Andrew McNaughton in a 1945 federal by-election. Provincially, his earlier vehement doubts about radicals among auto workers now muted, Hepburn formed a Liberal-Labour alliance with the Communist Party of Canada (then known as the Labor-Progressive Party) for the 1945 Ontario election but lost his own seat in the legislature.

Hepburn retired to his farm in St. Thomas, where he died of a heart attack in 1953. His funeral was attended by five former premiers, and Rev. Harry Scott Rodney observed in his eulogy:

Legacy

Hepburn's personality was complex, as The Globe and Mail'' noted in its obituary for him:

Hepburn was the first Liberal to become Premier since George William Ross, and was the last Liberal Premier to win two successive majority terms until Dalton McGuinty.

In 2008, he had a school named after him. Only miles away from his family's farm, Bannockburn Farms, it was officially opened in January 2009.

References

Further reading

External links
 
 
 
 
 Mitchell F. Hepburn fonds, Archives of Ontario

1896 births
1953 deaths
Premiers of Ontario
Leaders of the Ontario Liberal Party
Finance ministers of Ontario
Canadian military personnel of World War I
Members of the United Church of Canada
People from St. Thomas, Ontario